Urdanostindene or Uranostinden is a mountain in Norway. The peak marks the tri-point border between the municipalities of Luster Municipality and Årdal Municipality in Vestland county, and Vang Municipality in Innlandet county. The mountain is surrounded by several other notable mountains including Mjølkedalstinden to the northeast, Langeskavltinden and Storegut to the east, Langeskavlen to the southeast, and Falketind to the southwest. There is a large glacier located on the east side of the mountain.

See also
List of mountains of Norway by height

References

Vang, Innlandet
Luster, Norway
Årdal
Mountains of Innlandet
Mountains of Vestland